Chrysiptera tricincta, also known as the threeband damselfish and threeband demoiselle, is a species of damselfish in the family Pomacentridae. It is native to the western Pacific Ocean. It reaches about 6 centimeters in length. It has some commercial importance as an aquarium pet.

References

tricincta
Taxa named by Gerald R. Allen
Taxa named by John Ernest Randall
Fish described in 1974